Katharine Jeannette Bush (December 30, 1855 – January 19, 1937) was an American zoologist and marine biologist.

Biography
She was born in Scranton, Pennsylvania, and was educated in the public and private schools of New Haven, Connecticut. In 1901, she became the first woman to receive a Ph.D. in zoology at Yale University. In her dissertation, Bush described three new genera and sixteen new species of the Sabellides and Serpulides tribes, which were collected during the Harriman Alaska Expedition that her brother-in-law, Wesley Roswell Coe, attended in 1899.

Bush studied zoology under A. E. Verrill and in 1879 assumed the position of assistant in the Peabody Museum of Natural History, the zoological museum at Yale University, until 1913. She served on the United States Fish Commission between 1881 and 1888, helped to edit the 1890 edition of Webster's dictionary, and was made a member of the American Society of Naturalists and the American Society of Zoologists. She wrote "The Tubicolous Annelids of the Tribes Sabellides and Serpulides," in Harriman Alaska Expedition, volume XII (1905), besides Deep Water Mollusca (1885) and New Species of Turbonilla (1899).

During her career, Bush published 19 works, between articles and monographs, which was a very high number for women in this area at the time.

See also 

 Timeline of women in science

References

External links 
 
 
 

American science writers
People from Scranton, Pennsylvania
Yale Graduate School of Arts and Sciences alumni
American zoologists
American naturalists
1855 births
1937 deaths
United States Fish Commission personnel
American women biologists